Edward Kearney Hudson (January 1887 - January 1945) was an English footballer. His regular position was at full back. He was born in Bolton. He played for Manchester United, Walkden Central, and Stockport County.

External links
MUFCInfo.com profile

1887 births
1945 deaths
English footballers
Manchester United F.C. players
Stockport County F.C. players
Association football fullbacks